R'coon Dawg is a 1951 American animated short film produced by Walt Disney and directed by Charles August Nichols. It was the 123rd short in the Mickey Mouse film series to be released, and the only one produced that year.

Even though this cartoon belongs to the Mickey Mouse series, and Mickey Mouse is shown in hunting gear, Pluto is the main character.

Plot 
Mickey and Pluto are hunting a raccoon, who is quite clever and intends to make fun of his pursuers.

Voice cast 
 Pluto: Pinto Colvig
 Mickey Mouse: Jimmy MacDonald

Home media 
The short was released on May 18, 2004, on Walt Disney Treasures: Mickey Mouse in Living Color, Volume Two: 1939-Today.

See also 
Mickey Mouse (film series)

References

External links 
 
 R'Coon Dawg on YouTube

1951 animated films
1951 short films
1950s Disney animated short films
Films about raccoons
Films about hunters
Films produced by Walt Disney
Mickey Mouse short films
Films scored by Paul Smith (film and television composer)
Films directed by Charles August Nichols
1950s English-language films
American animated short films
RKO Pictures short films
RKO Pictures animated short films
Animated films about dogs